Klazienaveen-Noord is a hamlet in the Netherlands and it is part of the Emmen municipality in Drenthe.

Klazienaveen-Noord does not have a statistical entity, and the postal authorities have placed it under Klazienaveen. The hamlet started in 1902 around a church built by Braakhekke for the inhabitants of Klazienaveen. In 1923, a stone church was built. There are about 80 houses in the hamlet.

References 

Populated places in Drenthe
Emmen, Netherlands